Alexander B. Ellis III (born January 1, 1949), formerly an executive with alternative energy companies, and now a partner in the venture-capital firm Rockport Capital Partners.  He is a nephew of former President of the United States George H. W. Bush and a first cousin of former President George W. Bush and the former Governor of Florida John Ellis "Jeb" Bush.

Family background
Ellis's father was Alexander B. (Sandy) Ellis II, an insurance executive in Boston who studied at Yale University. Ellis II (1922–1989) was an executive with insurance firm Fairfield & Ellis (which merged into Corroon & Black, now a part of Willis Group Holdings). His mother is Nancy Walker Bush Ellis, a sister of former President George H. W. Bush. Both Ellis II and Bush were members of Skull and Bones at Yale.

Education
Ellis grew up in Concord, Massachusetts and attended Milton Academy, he later went to Colorado College. He studied business at Yale University receiving a Masters in Business Administration.

Career

Early in his career Ellis went to work for US Senator Edward Brooke (R-MA) as a Legislative Assistant. While working for Senator Brooke among the issues he studied was the turmoil in the nation's energy supply caused by the change towards a more assertive pricing strategy by members of OPEC. Ellis entered the alternative energy sector upon leaving Brooke's office. Energy efficiency was his specialization. He was hired eventually  by the furniture firm Knoll. Knoll was later acquired by Westinghouse. Ellis was recruited to Kenetech Corporation, one of the nation's foremost windpower development and turbine manufacturers. Kenetech obtained venture capital support and quickly achieved an important place in the industry. Subsequent to Kenetech and before joining RockPort, Ellis and a partner formed a company which developed two independent power plants. Since 1998 Alexander Ellis III has been a partner with the firm Rockport Capital Partners. Alexander Ellis III is Chairman of Clean Diesel Technologies Inc.

Honors

 Member of the Board, George Bush Presidential Library Foundation
 Member of the Board, Cornell Lab of Ornithology
 Massachusetts Audubon Society, council member and member of the finance and administration committee.

References

External links
Rockport Capital Partners: Alexander "Hap" Ellis

1949 births
Living people
Bush family
Milton Academy alumni
Colorado College alumni
Yale School of Management alumni